Moustapha Dicko is President of Malian Parliamentarian group ADEMA-PASJ and a member of the Pan-African Parliament.

External links
Members of the Pan-African Parliament

Members of the Pan-African Parliament from Mali
Year of birth missing (living people)
Living people
Alliance for Democracy in Mali politicians
Place of birth missing (living people)
21st-century Malian politicians